Municipal elections were held in the Canadian province of Newfoundland and Labrador on September 26, 2017. This article lists the results in selected municipalities. Results are for mayoral elections unless otherwise specified.

Bay Roberts

Clarenville

Conception Bay South

Corner Brook

Mayor

City council

Deer Lake

Gander

Grand Falls-Windsor

Happy Valley-Goose Bay

Labrador City
Council voted in 2017 to not hold a separate election for mayor. The council candidate who wins the most votes is elected mayor.

Marystown

Mount Pearl

Mayor

City Council

Paradise

Mayor

City Council

By-election, 2019

Portugal Cove-St. Philip's

St. John's

Mayor

Deputy Mayor

City Council

By-election
A by-election was held October 20, 2020 in Ward 2 to fill the vacancy caused by the resignation of Hope Jamieson.

Stephenville

Torbay

References

2017 elections in Canada
2017